The Château de Châteaudun is a castle located in the town of Châteaudun in the French department of Eure-et-Loir.

History 
The castle was built between the 12th and 16th centuries.

The Count of Blois Thibaut V had the keep built around 1170. The Sainte-Chapelle was built between 1451 and 1493. The choir and the high chapel were built between 1451 and 1454, with the nave and the oratory between 1460 and 1464.

Together with the Château de Montsoreau (1453) and the Palais Jacques-Cœur (1451), Châteaudun's 15th-century additions are among the earliest examples of residences built essentially for leisure in France.

Jehan de Dunois, the bâtard d'Orléans (Bastard of Orléans), built the west wing (the "aile Dunois") between 1459 and 1468.

The bell tower was erected in 1493.

François I of Orléans-Longueville began construction of the north wing (the "aile Longueville") between 1469 and 1491. The upper floors were added by François II d'Orléans-Longueville and his descendants during the first quarter of the 16th century.

Today

The castle includes:
 a chapel from the 15th century (one of the seven remaining Sainte Chapelle kind of chapels in France)
 the Dunois wing from the 15th century
 the Longueville wing from the end of the 15th century

The château overlooks the Loir River. Perched on a limestone outcrop, it shows its origins as a 12th-century fortress. Converted by Jean de Dunois during the Renaissance into a comfortable residence, the main body of the building is roofed in the gothic style. It still has, notably, a finely carved staircase from this period.

Renovated since the 1930s, the castle has been designated as a monument historique (historic monument) since 1918.

See also
List of châteaux in Eure-et-Loir
List of castles in France

References

External links 

 
 Official site of the town 
 Full history and pictures of Château de Châteaudun 
 Château de Châteaudun  on Google Cultural Institute

Castles in Centre-Val de Loire
Historic house museums in Centre-Val de Loire
Chateaudun
Museums in Eure-et-Loir
Chateau, Chateaudun
Monuments of the Centre des monuments nationaux